Meryem Koç (born November 28, 1996) is a Turkish women's football goalkeeper currently playing in the Turkish Women's First Football League for Ataşehir Belediyespor with jersey number 13.

Playing career

Club

Meryem Koç obtained her license on December 31, 2009, and started to play in the 2010–11 season as a forward for her hometown team Hatay Dumlupınarspor in the Women's Second League. After two seasons, she transferred on October 22, 2012, as goalkeeper to Adana İdmanyurduspor, which competes in the Women's First League.

On June 28, 2018, Koç signed with the Istanbul-based club Ataşehir Belediyespor before the club's participation at the 2018–19 UEFA Women's Champions League qualifying round. She played in one of the three matches of the qualification round.

International
In 2014, Meryem Koç was admitted to the Turkey women's national U-19 team, and debuted internationally in the friendly match against Belarus on June 11, 2014. She took part at the 2015 UEFA Women's Under-19 Championship qualification – Group 4 matches, and at the 2015 Elite round.

Meryem Koç was called up to the Turkey women's national team, and played at the UEFA Women's Euro 2017 qualifying Group 5 matches.

Career statistics
.

References

External links
Meryem Koç – UEFA competition record

Living people
1996 births
People from Antakya
Turkish women's footballers
Women's association football goalkeepers
Turkey women's international footballers
Adana İdmanyurduspor players
Ataşehir Belediyespor players
21st-century Turkish women
Sportspeople from Hatay